Marian Tican (born 28 May 1978) is a Romanian luger. He competed in the men's singles and doubles events at the 2002 Winter Olympics.

References

External links
 

1978 births
Living people
Romanian male lugers
Olympic lugers of Romania
Lugers at the 2002 Winter Olympics
People from Sinaia